Oradea Transport Local S.A. or simply OTL is the municipality-owned public transport company in Oradea. It is one of the successors of the communist-era state-owned transport company, "Intreprinderea Judeţeană de Transport Local" Bihor, or IJTL.

The company operates various tram and bus lines in Oradea, being responsible for 100% of the local mass transit network. As of 2014, it also operates bus lines in the Oradea Metropolitan Area, connecting nearby thermal bath resorts of Băile Felix and  Băile 1 Mai, and the towns of Betfia, Cihei, Cordău, Borş, Săntăul Mare, Săntăul Mic, Sântion and Sânmartin to the city centre.

Fleet

The company owns trams as well as buses.

Trams:

 Tatra T4  and variants: T4D (6 units), B4D (5 units)
 Tatra KT4DM (30 units)
 Siemens ULF A1 (10 units)
 Astra Imperio (20 units)

Buses:
111 buses
 Mercedes O345 (1)
Mercedes Conecto  (16)
Mercedes Citaro NGT Hybrid (15)
Mercedes Citaro K Hybrid (1)
 Volvo B7R Localo (12)
 Solaris Urbino 12 (10)
 Mercedes Conecto NG (6)
Volvo Vest B7RLE (13)
Isuzu Novociti 27-MD(7)
 Karsan Jest(5)
Man Lion's City NG263 (1)
Iveco Daily(1)
Mercedes O405 GN2(1)
Man Lion's City A78(13)
Volvo 8700 LE(3)
Mercedes O530 Citaro G (2)
Mercedes  Citaro G (4)

References

External links

Oradea
Oradea
Oradea
Oradea
Companies of Bihor County